The following is the list of fictional foxes. Fictional foxes have appeared in various artforms and media throughout centuries. This is an alphabetical list by medium.

Foxes in theater 
Basil Brush, a puppet.
Bystrouška, a vixen from the opera The Cunning Little Vixen by Leoš Janáček (referred to as just "Vixen" in the English translation).
Foulfellow the Fox, from Pinocchio (1940 Disney film).
Sebastian, a gay fox director from Meet the Feebles.
Zlatohřbítek, a fox in the opera The Cunning Little Vixen by Leoš Janáček (referred to as just "Fox" in the English translation).

Foxes in comics 
 Br'er Fox in the Disney comics featuring Br'er Rabbit. 
 Bystrouška, a vixen from the comic strip Vixen Sharp-ears by the opera The Cunning Little Vixen by Rudolf Těsnohlídek and Stanislav Lolek, later adapted into an opera by Leoš Janáček as The Cunning Little Vixen 
Fiona Fox, from Sonic the Hedgehog.
 Faux Pas.
 Freddy and Ferdie Fox.
 Joris Goedbloed in Tom Poes and Panda by Marten Toonder.
 Jujube in Gai-Luron by Marcel Gotlib.
 Ozy and Millie.
 Renato, from Andrea Romoli's comic strip.
Seminole Sam in Pogo.
Slylock Fox, a detective in Slylock Fox & Comics for Kids
 Tails, from Sonic the Hedgehog.
 McFox (Raposão), from Lionel's Kingdom/Monica's Gang
 Vlop, title character in a Dutch comic strip by Ronald Sinoo, which was published in the wildlife magazine Wapiti.

Foxes in animation 
 Br'er Fox in Disney's Song of the South.
 Br'er Fox in Ralph Bakshi's Coonskin. 
 Candle Fox from Kiff
 Diane Foxington / "The Crimson Paw" in The Bad Guys
 Fenneko from Aggretsuko.
 Fibber Fox in Yakky Doodle.
 Foulfellow the Fox, from Disney's Pinocchio.
 The Fox in The Fox and the Crow.
 Fox, in the Canadian children's series Franklin.
 Fox, from Skunk Fu!
 Foxy, an early Warner Brothers Animation character who looked almost exactly like Mickey Mouse. His girlfriend Roxy was also a fox and looked like Minnie Mouse.
 Freddy Fox, a character in Peppa Pig
 Fuchsia, a secretary who has more sense than her boss, Tyrannicaus, in Animalia (TV series).
 George the fox from Of Fox and Hounds.
 Kurama, a fox demon thief who is reborn as a human in Yu Yu Hakusho.
 Kurama, the nine tailed fox that is sealed inside Naruto Uzumaki from the series Naruto.
 The little fox, whose name is a "little fox" too. Urusei Yatsura.
 Mimi LaFloo, a vixen in Bucky O'Hare.
 Muggy-Doo.
 Nanao, a tiny kitsune from Ask Dr. Rin!
 Nick Wilde in Disney's Zootopia.
 Pablo the Little Red Fox.
 Pammee in YooHoo & Friends-related series.
 Parisa, Leah's pet purple fox in the Canadian-American animated series Shimmer and Shine
 Ponchi and Conchi see also List of fictional raccoons from Shaman King...
 Renamon and Kyubimon in Digimon.
 Rita, young vixen, in the Jungledyret Hugo series.
 Robin Hood and Maid Marian in Disney's Robin Hood.
 Roy Fox from Kiff
 Swifty and Jade from Arctic Dogs
 Swiper the Fox, a thief in Dora the Explorer.
 King Voracious, Attila, Evita, Todd, et al. in The Foxbusters.
 Tails, in Sonic the Hedgehog, Sonic X, and Adventures of Sonic the Hedgehog series.
 Tod and Vixey from Disney's The Fox and the Hound (Tod is also in The Fox and the Hound 2).
 Kaiketsu Zorori.

Mythological and folklore foxes
Kitsune – fox spirits the strongest being a nine-tailed fox (Japanese mythology). 
Kudagitsune – in Japanese mythology.
Kumiho – in Korean mythology.
Kuzunoha in Japanese Mythology.
Huli jing in Chinese Mythology.
Tamamo-no-Mae in Japanese Mythology.
Teumessian fox in Greek mythology.
Youko fox demons in Japanese mythology.
Foxes in several Greek fables, including:
The Fox and the Grapes
The Fox and the Crow
The Fox and the Stork
The Wild Boar and the Fox
The Fox and the Sick Lion
The Fox and the Mask
The Fox and the Woodman
The Fox and the Lion
The Lion, the Bear and the Fox
The Fox and the Weasel

Foxes in literature 

 Br'er Fox from the Uncle Remus stories by Joel Chandler Harris.
 J.C., in the Catfish Bend series by Ben Lucien Burman.
 Reddy Fox, in the stories of Thornton Burgess.
 Reynard the Fox in the Reynard cycle.
 Scarlett Fox, from the magazine Ranger Rick.

Foxes in film and television
 Bravo Fox, from Zoobilee Zoo.
 Br'er Fox in Disney's Song of the South.
 Br'er Fox in Ralph Bakshi's Coonskin. 
 Mr. Fox in Fantastic Mr. Fox, based on Roald Dahl's eponymous children's book. 
Foulfellow the Fox from Disney's Pinocchio. 
 Lowieke de Vos in De Fabeltjeskrant.
 Nelson and Vince, from Mongrels.
 Nick Wilde in Disney's Zootopia.
 Parisa, Leah’s pet purple fox in Shimmer and Shine.
 Robin Hood and Maid Marian in Disney's Robin Hood.
 Rita, red fox, in the Jungledyret Hugo animated series.
 Shippo, a young fox demon in Inuyasha (Series)
 Tod from Disney's The Fox and the Hound and The Fox and the Hound 2.
Vuk from Vuk, based on the eponymous novel by István Fekete.

Foxes in music 
 Mr Fox, a 1970s folk rock band.
 The Fox (What Does The Fox Say?), a song by Norwegian comedy duo Ylvis.
The foxes in "I Know Places" by Taylor Swift

Foxes in video games 
Benjamin, a sly male fox in Little Misfortune.
Carmelita Fox, a female fox in Sly Cooper.
 Corrine in Tales of Symphonia.
 Crazy Redd, the Black Market salesman from the Animal Crossing games.
Fox McCloud and Krystal in Star Fox series.
 Foxy the Pirate and Mangle from the Five Nights at Freddy's series.
 Foxy Roxy, a lycra-wearing vixen in Brutal: Paws of Fury.
 Greggory "Gregg" Lee, a main character in Night in the Woods.
 Kingsley, the head character in Kingsley's Adventure.
 Kitsune or (Fox) in Persona 4, who is part of the social links.
 Lucky, the main character of Super Lucky's Tale
 Ninetails, a major boss character from the game Ōkami. Its source of power is the Fox Rods, which contain nine Tube Foxes, one for each tail. During battle with Ninetails, the tails turn into women and must be defeated individually. This character's name is spelled differently than Ninetales.
Pretztail in Viva Piñata. Pretztails is a fox piñata.
 Psycho Fox, the main character in a Sega Master System game of the same name.
 Reynardo, the player character of Stories: The Path of Destinies.
 Rif and his girlfriend in the computer game Inherit the Earth: Quest for the Orb.
 Snipe, a hybrid fox/paradise of bird in Crash of the Titans.
Spy Fox, the title character of a computer game series by Humongous Entertainment
Tails, in Sonic the Hedgehog.
 Titus the Fox: To Marrakech and Back, fox mascot in a platform game.
 Vulpix, Ninetales, Eevee, Fennekin, Braixen, Delphox, Nickit, Thievul, and Zorua and Zoroark in Pokémon. Although Vulpix, Ninetales and Zoroark are based on Kitsune.
 Ran Yakumo, a boss in Perfect Cherry Blossom.

Foxes as toys, mascots, and others 
Necky the Fox – The mascot of Famitsu magazine.
Filbert Fox - The mascot of ''Leicester City Football club

See also
:Category:Fictional foxes
List of fictional animals

References

Foxes